The 1970 Quebec general election was held on April 29, 1970, to elect members of the National Assembly of Quebec. The former Legislative Assembly had been renamed the "National Assembly" in 1968. The Quebec Liberal Party, led by Robert Bourassa, defeated the incumbent Union Nationale, led by Premier Jean-Jacques Bertrand.

This election marked the first appearance by a new party, the sovereigntist Parti Québécois, led by former Liberal cabinet minister René Lévesque. The PQ won a modest seven seats and came second in the popular vote, although Lévesque was defeated in his own riding.

Only a few months after the election, Quebec faced a severe test with the October Crisis, in which Liberal cabinet minister Pierre Laporte was kidnapped and assassinated by the Front de libération du Québec, a violent pro-independence group.

The Union Nationale, which had governed Quebec through most of the 1940s and 1950s, would never come close to winning power again.  This was partly because a significant number of the Union Nationale's younger supporters had embraced sovereigntism and shifted their support to the PQ.

Results

Note:

 Results change is compared to the combined totals of the Rassemblement pour l'indépendance nationale and Ralliement national from previous election.

* Party did not nominate candidates in the previous election.

See also
 List of Quebec premiers
 Politics of Quebec
 Timeline of Quebec history
 List of Quebec political parties
 29th National Assembly of Quebec
 New Democratic Party of Quebec candidates, 1970 Quebec provincial election

Further reading

External links
 CBC TV video clip

Quebec general election
Elections in Quebec
General election
Quebec general election